Day 1 is Robbie Nevil's third (and, to date, final) studio album, released in 1991.

Track listing
"Introduction" – 0:39
"Just Like You" (Robbie Nevil) - 4:05
"For Your Mind" (Nevil, Steve Dubin) - 3:47
"Do You Miss Me" (Nevil) - 4:21
"Temptation" (feat. Rose Stone and Larry Graham) (Nevil, Steve Dubin, Kevin Savigar, Jeff Pescetto) - 4:26
"Tell Me Something Good" (Stevie Wonder) - 3:41
"What Everybody Wants" (Nevil, Tommy Faragher, Lotti Golden) - 4:36
"Goin' Through the Motions" (Nevil, Mark Mueller) - 3:18
"Partners in Crime" (Nevil, John Peart Charles) - 4:34
"Welcome to the Party" (Nevil, Tommy Faragher, Lotti Golden)- 4:15
"Paradise" (Nevil) - 3:00
"Sensual" (Nevil, Steve Dubin, Mark Mueller) - 4:36
"Same Ole Song" (Nevil) - 4:08

Personnel
Robbie Nevil - guitar, vocals
Joe Bissett – bass
J. P. Charles – drums
Steve Dubin – drums
Tommy Faragher – bass, keyboards
Jimmy Johnson – bass
Brian Kilgor – percussion
Terry Marshall – bass, keyboards
Greg St. Regis – bass
Kevin Savigar – Hammond organ
Neil Stubenhaus – bass
John Van Tongeren – keyboards
Mona Lisa Young (1, 3, 4), Voncielle Faggett (1-7, 9, 11, 12), Rheji Burrell (2, 5, 11), Laura Hunter (5, 7, 13), Larry Graham (5), Rose Stone (5), Alfie Silas (10, 12) - backing vocals

Charts

References

1991 albums
Robbie Nevil albums
EMI Records albums